Eno may refer to:

Music 

 English National Opera, London
 Eno, an album by Japanese band Polysics

Organisations and businesses
 Eno (company), a Chinese clothing and accessories business
 Eno Center for Transportation, a non-profit think tank in Washington, D.C.
 European Northern Observatory, a group of astronomical observatories
 Environment Online, an international educational network

Places 
 Eno, Finland, a former municipality, now part of Joensuu
 Eno, North Carolina, a settlement
 Eno River, in North Carolina

People

In business
 Amos Eno (1810–1898), owner of the Fifth Avenue Hotel, New York
 Henry Lane Eno (1871–1928), American banker, poet and philanthropist
 James Crossley Eno (1820–1915), British pharmacist
 William Phelps Eno (1858–1945), American businessman

In music
 Brian Eno (born 1948), English electronic musician, music theorist and record producer
 Jim Eno (born 1966), one of the founding members of the band Spoon
 Kenji Eno (1970–2013), Japanese musician and video game designer
 Roger Eno (born 1959), English ambient composer, brother of Brian
 Eno Barony (born 1991), Ghanaian rapper
 Eno (rapper) (born 1998), German rapper

Other people
 Eno Benjamin (born 1999), American football player
 Eno Raud (1928–1996), Estonian children's books writer
 Daikan Enō, the Japanese name of Zen patriarch Dajian Huineng
 Sarah Eno, American physicist
 Will Eno (born 1965), Obie-Award winning American playwright

Peoples 
 Eno people, North American tribe
 Eno, a name given to Ibibio people

Other uses
 Eno (drug), an antacid
 Eno (film), a 1973 documentary short film
 En'ō, a Japanese era
 Exhaled nitric oxide, measured in a breath test for asthma

See also 
 Enos (disambiguation)